Michaeli may refer to:

People

Anastasia Michaeli (born 1975), Israeli politician
Avraham Michaeli (born 1957), Israeli politician
Dani Michaeli (born 1969), American television writer and producer
Louise Michaëli (1830–75), Swedish opera singer
Merav Michaeli (born 1966) - Israeli politician
Mic Michaeli (born 1962), Swedish keyboardist in rock band Europe
Rivka Michaeli (born 1938), Israeli actress, comedian, television hostess, and entertainer
Yair Michaeli (born 1944), Israeli Olympic competitive sailor

Animals

Chromodoris michaeli, species of sea slug
Hemiscyllium michaeli, species of bamboo shark
Neurocordulia michaeli, species of dragonfly